The Commerce and Economic Development Bureau is an agency of the Government of Hong Kong responsible for policy matters on Hong Kong's external commercial relations, inward investment promotion, intellectual property protection, industry and business support, tourism, consumer protection and competition, as well as broadcasting, film-related issues, overall view of creative industries, development of telecommunications, and control of obscene and indecent articles in Hong Kong.

The bureau is headed by the Secretary for Commerce and Economic Development, currently Edward Yau. It is divided into the Commerce, Industry and Tourism Branch and the Communications and Creative Industry Branch, each headed by a Permanent Secretary.

History

Subordinate departments 
The following public entities are managed by the bureau:
Hong Kong Economic and Trade Offices (Overseas)
Intellectual Property Department
Invest Hong Kong
Office of the Communications Authority
Post Office
Radio Television Hong Kong
Trade and Industry Department

See also  
Hong Kong Disciplined Services
Hong Kong Trade Development Council
Consumer Council (Hong Kong)
Competition Commission
Communications Authority
Hong Kong Export Credit Insurance Corporation

References

External links
Commerce and Economic Development Bureau (Official site)

Hong Kong government policy bureaux